The Council for the United States and Italy (CONSIUSA) is a non-profit, organization founded in 1983 whose purpose is to foster better ties between the United States and Italy, with a focus on economy and finance. David Rockefeller and Gianni Agnelli are among its founding members. Robert Agostinelli was former Vice-Chairman of the Council for the United States & Italy.

The Council for the United States and Italy created the Young Leaders Program in 1984; it is the Council’s oldest and most regular program.

Notable individuals who are Young Leader Program alumni:

 Elena Rossini

References

Foreign relations of the United States
Foreign relations of Italy
Non-profit organizations based in the United States
Italian-American culture
Non-profit organisations based in Italy
Organizations established in 1983